Daniel Welch may refer to:

Daniel Welch (ice hockey) (born 1981), American professional ice hockey player
Daniel Welch (racing driver) (born 1982), British auto racing driver
Danny Welch, American biologist

See also
Dan Welcher (born 1948), American composer, conductor, and music educator